Marinomonas arctica is a Gram-negative, psychrotolerant and motile bacterium from the genus of Marinomonas which has been isolated from sea-ice from the Canadian Basin from the Arctic Ocean.

References

External links
Type strain of Marinomonas arctica at BacDive -  the Bacterial Diversity Metadatabase

Oceanospirillales
Bacteria described in 2008
Psychrophiles